Old Portlock School No. 5 is a historic school building located at Chesapeake, Virginia.  It was built in 1908, and is a one-story, rectangular, Colonial Revival style brick building.  It features a hipped roof and a classical temple fronted porch with frieze, pediment, cornice, columns and pilasters.  It continued to serve as an educational facility until the mid-1960s.

It was listed on the National Register of Historic Places in 2000.

References

School buildings on the National Register of Historic Places in Virginia
Colonial Revival architecture in Virginia
School buildings completed in 1908
Schools in Chesapeake, Virginia
National Register of Historic Places in Chesapeake, Virginia
1908 establishments in Virginia